Punjab De SuperChecf is an Indian Punjabi-language cooking reality television show which is telecast on PTC Punjabi.

Punjab De SuperChef Season 4 began from January 18, 2019. In this season, chef Amrita Raichand is judging the show which is being telecast on PTC Punjabi every Friday after Live Gurbani from Harmandir Sahib.

Winners 

 Season 1 - Balvinder Singh
 Season 2 - Sakshi Batra
 Season 3 - Alka
 Season 4 - Vandana Gupta
 Season 5 - Neeru Pathak

References

External links 
Video Editor anil bhatia

 Official Web Site

Indian reality television series
PTC Punjabi original programming
2010 Indian television series debuts
Television shows set in Punjab, India
Indian cooking television series
Punjabi-language television shows